Money For Nothing is a British television programme hosted, on a rotational basis, by Sarah Moore, Jacqui Joseph, JJ Chalmers and formerly Jay Blades, EJ Osborne, that airs on BBC. Earlier series are also available for viewing on Netflix.

Format
The premise of the programme is to take items that other people have disposed of and which the presenter rescues from council refuse collection sites. With the help of a designer they are turned into desirable items, which are then sold. Any profit made is then returned to the individual(s) who disposed of the item originally. The show voice-over is provided by comedian and writer Arthur Smith. Celebrity Money for Nothing was a related programme and only lasted one series.

Regular designers and craftspeople include: Norman Wilkinson, Rupert Blanchard, Forge Creative (Josh Kennard & Oliver "Oli" Milne), Sarah Peterson, bag designer Neil Wragg, Lighting Expert Duncan McKean of Albert & Edward, Ray Clarke, Daniel Heath, Mark 'Horse' Philips, Bex Simon, The Rag and Bone Man, Guy Trench,  Simion Dallas Hawtin-Smith and Bruce Faulseit.

Presenters

Sarah Moore's law

Jacqui Joseph
Jacqui Joseph joined the presenting team from series 9.

JJ Chalmers
JJ Chalmers joined the presenting team from series 10.

Former presenters

Jay Blades
Jay Blades first appeared as one of the designer experts for the first two series before becoming a presenter from Series 3 onwards. In 2021, due to other TV commitments (The Repair Shop, Jay and Dom's Home Fix), Blades no longer hosts the programme.

EJ Osborne
EJ Osborne joined the presenting team during series 4. He departed during series 7 due to illness. He died on 22 September 2020 at Dorothy House Hospice following months of chemotherapy.

Series overview

Regular series

Celebrity series

See also
 Upcycling

References

External links
 
 Celebrity Money for Nothing

2015 British television series debuts
2010s British reality television series
2020s British reality television series
BBC Television shows
English-language television shows
Reuse
Recycling